Denver Water is a public water utility that serves the City and County of Denver, Colorado, and a portion of its surrounding suburbs. Established in 1918, the utility is funded by water rates and new tap fees, not taxes. It is Colorado's oldest and largest water utility.

Overview
Denver Water's primary water sources are the South Platte River, Blue River, Williams Fork and Fraser River watersheds, but it also uses water from the South Boulder Creek, Ralston Creek and Bear Creek watersheds.

History
The first residents of the Denver area drank water directly from nearby creeks and rivers. Surface wells and buckets of water sufficed for a while as a delivery system, but they soon proved inadequate. Irrigation ditches were the next step forward.

In 1870, the community was growing at a rapid rate. To keep up with demand from the area's 5,000 residents, the Denver City Water Company was formed. In 1872, with a large well, a steam pump and four miles (6 km) of mains, Denver City Water Company began to provide water to homes. Over the next two decades, 10 water companies fought, collapsed or merged. Several companies merged, and in 1894, the Denver Union Water Company—predecessor of Denver Water—emerged to establish a stable system.

In 1918, Denver residents voted to form a five-member Board of Water Commissioners and buy the Denver Union Water Company's water system for $14 million, creating Denver Water. From that time on, Denver Water planned and developed a system to meet the needs of the people of Denver and the surrounding areas.

Flash floods between 1996 and 2002 led to erosion and damage to Denver's reservoirs. This erosion was exacerbated by insects and disease in the 1990s that had weakened forests. To address this, Denver Water began replanting mountainsides with drought-resistant trees in order to better maintain its waterways.

Lead service pipes
Lead pipes were used to hook homes to water mains until the World War II era. Although lead pipes were banned in 1971, Denver Water officials estimate that there are between 64,000 and 84,000 homes still being serviced with lead pipes. A $500 million program to replace them is proceeding as of 2021 at the rate of about 5,000 homes a year. Whether a particular address has a lead service line may be searched for on a page on the Denver Water website.

See also
 Colorado Public Utilities Commission

References

External links
 Official website

Denver metropolitan area
Government of Denver
Water companies of the United States